This is a season-by-season list of records compiled by Massachusetts–Lowell in men's ice hockey.

The University of Massachusetts Lowell has won three NCAA Championship in its history, all at the Division II level.

Season-by-season results

Note: GP = Games played, W = Wins, L = Losses, T = Ties

* Winning percentage is used when conference schedules are unbalanced.† Lowell had been accepted into ECAC Hockey but had not yet begun a conference schedule.

Footnotes

References

 
Lists of college men's ice hockey seasons in the United States
UMass Lowell River Hawks ice hockey seasons